Annalissa Firth (born 1965 or 1966) is a British politician and former barrister who has served as the Member of Parliament (MP) for Southend West since the 2022 by-election. A member of the Conservative Party, she was also a councillor on Sevenoaks District Council between 2011 and 2022.

Early life and career
Firth was born and grew up in Leigh-on-Sea. Her early education was at a private school. Her mother was a teacher and her father was an engineer. She has a brother called William. Firth studied law at Durham University. She had a brief career as an investment banker before being called to the bar in 1991 at Inner Temple. She specialised in personal injury and professional negligence law. Firth was elected as a councillor representing Brasted, Chevening & Sundridge ward on Sevenoaks District Council in Kent in 2011 and resigned the seat in 2022. She was elected as the National Voluntary Director of the grassroots think-tank Conservative Policy Forum in April 2020 and has also been a board member of the Conservative Environment Network. Firth co-founded the online summer school Invicta Academy in 2020 in response to the COVID-19 pandemic. She supports the expansion of grammar schools in the UK.

Political career
Firth was the sixth candidate placed on the Conservative party list in South East England  for the European Parliament elections. She was selected as the Conservative candidate for the 2022 Southend West by-election on 11 December 2021. The by-election was called after the murder of David Amess, the constituency's incumbent Conservative MP on 15 October 2021. The Labour Party, Liberal Democrats, and Green Party did not field any candidates. The constituency is considered a safe Conservative seat and has been represented by a member of the party since its creation in 1950. Firth was elected with a majority of 12,280 (82.7%) on a turnout of 24.0%. She had previously stood as parliamentary candidate in the Erith and Thamesmead seat in the 2015 general election and the Canterbury seat in the 2019 general election. Firth has been a member of the Education Select Committee since March 2022. In her maiden speech on 10 May 2022, she paid tribute to her predecessor as MP, Sir David Amess and his family.

Firth visited Archie Battersbee, a 12-year-old boy from Southend at the centre of a life-support withdrawal dispute, in June 2022 and contributed to a fundraiser for him. She criticised how the case was handled stating, "The state process for dealing with the withdrawal of life support for a child where there is a dispute between the parents and the hospital is just not appropriate", and asked for a meeting with the then Secretary of State for Health and Social Care Steve Barclay in August 2022.

She voiced her support for Priti Patel in the July 2022 Conservative Party leadership election on 10 July 2022. Two days later, Patel announced she would not be a candidate in the election. Firth later backed Liz Truss in August 2022. She was then appointed Parliamentary Private Secretary (PPS) to the Department for International Trade in the Truss ministry. The following month, after the resignation of Truss and the succession of Rishi Sunak, Firth was appointed PPS to the Attorney General for England and Wales Victoria Prentis in the Sunak ministry.

Personal life
She is married to Edward who is a managing director of the investment banking firm Keefe, Bruyette & Woods. They have three children.

References

External links

 

 

1960s births
21st-century English women politicians
Alumni of Durham University
Conservative Party (UK) MPs for English constituencies
Conservative Party (UK) councillors
Councillors in Kent
English barristers
English women lawyers
Female members of the Parliament of the United Kingdom for English constituencies
Living people
People from Leigh-on-Sea
Politicians from Essex
UK MPs 2019–present
Women councillors in England